Jewish Neo-Aramaic can refer to several related Neo-Aramaic languages and dialects:

Inter-Zab Jewish Neo-Aramaic
Jewish Neo-Aramaic dialect of Barzani
Jewish Neo-Aramaic dialect of Betanure
Jewish Neo-Aramaic dialect of Challa
Jewish Neo-Aramaic dialect of Koy Sanjaq
Jewish Neo-Aramaic dialect of Urmia
Jewish Neo-Aramaic dialect of Zakho
Sanandaj Jewish Neo-Aramaic
Trans-Zab Jewish Neo-Aramaic

See also
Jewish Palestinian Aramaic
Judeo-Aramaic languages
List of Jewish diaspora languages

Language and nationality disambiguation pages